Cuglieri is a comune (municipality) in the Province of Oristano in the Italian region Sardinia, located about  northwest of Cagliari and about  north of Oristano.

Wildfire 2021

See also 
 S'Archittu

References

External links 

Cities and towns in Sardinia